PICOe (PICO Express) within computer hardware is a computer form factor in which a half sized card slot Single Board Computer (SBC) is inserted into a gold fingers card slot of a passive or active backplane. Expansion peripherals of the computer system are connected to other slots of the backplane.

Electrical Bus Interface
PICOe provides one PCI bus and several PCI Express buses of varying and configurable widths to provide dual faceted interface with other devices on the backplane.

Power
Power is provided to the PICOe SBC and peripheral expansion cards via the backplane.

Connectors
The PICOe computer card slot uses a unique connector footprint with stepped connector depths to promote physical stability in the slot for ruggedization purposes.
Other card slots on the backplane may be standard Conventional PCI and PCIe connectors.

Motherboard form factors